Jenny Vertpré, real name Françoise Fanny Vausgien, (6 September 1797 – 3 November 1865) was a 19th-century French stage actress. Still a child, she performed under the name Jenny at the Théâtre du Vaudeville then became a leading actress of the Théâtre des Variétés (1821-1825) then of the Théâtre du Gymnase (1825-1834).

Theatre manager of the St James's Theatre in London, she still performed at the Théâtre de l'Odéon in 1839, the year when she eventually retired.

She married Pierre Carmouche in 1832.

Roles 
 1811: Princess Abricotine in Riquet à la houpe by Antoine Simonnin, Théâtre de la Gaîté
 1818: Simplette in Le Petit Chaperon rouge by Frédéric Dupetit-Méré and Nicolas Brazier, Théâtre de la Porte Saint-Martin
 1820: Lovette in  Le Vampire by Charles Nodier, Théâtre de la Porte Saint-Martin
 1826: Poleska in La Lune de miel by Eugène Scribe, Mélesville and Carmouche, Théâtre du Gymnase
 1826: Madame Pinchon in Le Mariage de raison by Eugène Scribe and Antoine-François Varner, Théâtre du Gymnase
 1828: Christine in La Reine de seize ans by Jean-François Bayard, Théâtre du Gymnase
 1833: Nadèje in Un trait de Paul I or le Czar et la Vivandière by Eugène Scribe and Paul Duport, Théâtre du Gymnase
 1835: Nichon in La Petite Nichon ou la Petite Paysanne de la Moselle by Pierre Villiers and Jean-Guillaume-Antoine Cuvelier, Théâtre des Variétés
 1837: Betzy in Le Chevalier d'Éon by Jean-François Bayard and Dumanoir, Théâtre des Variétés
 1838: la marquise in Les Dames de la halle by Charles Dupeuty and Louis-Émile Vanderburch, Théâtre des Variétés
 1838: Madame Pinchon in Madame et Monsieur Pinchon by Bayard, Dumanoir and Adolphe d'Ennery, Théâtre des Variétés

Bibliography 
 Biographies des artistes dramatiques par nos meilleurs auteurs contemporains, 1848 (Read on line)
 Edmond-Denis De Manne, Charles Ménétrier, Galerie historique des acteurs français, 1877, (p. 208)
 Eugène Bouvy, Jenny Vertpré (1797-1865), Gounouilhou, 1910
 Henry Lyonnet, Dictionnaire des comédiens français, 1911, (p. 703)

External links 
 Vertpré, Jenny on IdRef

19th-century French actresses
French stage actresses
Actresses from Bordeaux
1797 births
1865 deaths